Slipping Away or Slippin' Away may refer to:

"Slipping Away" (Dave Edmunds song), 1983
"Slippin' Away" (Jean Shepard song), 1973
"Slipping Away" (Mansun song), 2004
"Slipping Away" (Max Merritt and the Meteors song), 1975
"Slipping Away" (Moby song), 2006
"Slipping Away" (Rolling Stones song), 1989
Slipping Away (EP), an EP by Evermore
"Slipping Away", a song by Black Sabbath from Mob Rules
"Slipping Away", a song by Dope from Felons for LIFE
"Slipping Away", a song by Gigolo Aunts from Everybody Happy
"Slipping Away", a ballad by Hypocrisy from Abducted
"Slipping Away", a song by Mariah Carey, a B-side from the single "Always Be My Baby"
"Slipping Away", a track by Michael Andrews from the Donnie Darko soundtrack album
"Slipping Away", a song by Nine Inch Nails from Things Falling Apart
"Slipping Away", a song by Rick Astley from Whenever You Need Somebody
"Slipping Away", a song by Stabbing Westward from Wither Blister Burn & Peel
"Slipping Away", a song by Sum 41 from Chuck
"Slipping Away", a song by The Ghost Inside from Get What You Give
"Slipping Away", a song by Trust Company from The Lonely Position of Neutral
"Slipping Away", a song by UFO from You Are Here

See also
Slip Away (disambiguation)